The 2015–16 UIC Flames men's basketball team represented the University of Illinois at Chicago in the 2015–16 NCAA Division I men's basketball season. They were led by first-year head coach Steve McClain, hired in the offseason to replace Howard Moore. The Flames played their home games at the UIC Pavilion and were members of the Horizon League. They finished the season 5–25, 3–15 in Horizon League play to finish in last place. They lost in the first round of the Horizon League tournament to Wright State.

Previous season
The Flames finished towards the bottom of the Horizon League standings with a record of 4–12 (10–24). Following a semifinal exit in the conference tournament, head coach Howard Moore was let go. He was replaced by Indiana assistant and former Wyoming head coach Steve McClain.

Roster

Schedule

|-
!colspan=9 style="background:#003366; color:#CC0033;"| Exhibition

|-
!colspan=9 style="background:#003366; color:#CC0033;"|  Non-conference regular season

|-
!colspan=9 style="background:#003366; color:#CC0033;"| Horizon League regular season

|-
!colspan=9 style="background:#003366; color:#CC0033;"|Horizon League tournament

References

UIC Flames
UIC Flames men's basketball seasons
UIC Flames men's basket
UIC Flames men's basket